Patriotic Order Sons of America Washington Camp 422, also known as the Women's Society of Christian Service Hall, is a historic building located in Dreher Township, Wayne County, Pennsylvania. It was built in 1904, as a meeting hall for the local chapter of the Patriotic Order Sons of America.  It is a two-story, rectangular wood-frame building measuring approximately 22 feet wide and 44 feet deep.  A one-story addition was built in 1999.  The building houses the Greene-Dreher Historical Society's artifact collection.

It was listed on the National Register of Historic Places in 2010.

References

External links

Green-Dreyer Historical Society website

History museums in Pennsylvania
Clubhouses on the National Register of Historic Places in Pennsylvania
Buildings and structures completed in 1904
Buildings and structures in Wayne County, Pennsylvania
National Register of Historic Places in Wayne County, Pennsylvania